Mohamed Negm (15 January 1944 – 5 June 2019) was an Egyptian actor and comedian.

Career
Negm began his career in the 1960s with the troupe of iconic theatre director and actor Abdel-Monim Madbouly. Thene started acting in 1970 with small roles in cinema and television then he founded his own theatre which bears his name.

One of his most famous plays is Cuckoo's Nest. He is considered a landmark in comedy. Negm put on dozens of other plays, including One Wife is Enough (Zawga Waheda Takfi) (1979) starring Salah Zulfikar earning him fame, In the same year, Negm starred in Cuckoo's Nest (Esh El-Maganeen) (1979), with Hassan Abdeen and Laila Elwi, and it has always been one of his most popular, and it was staged for over three years. The comedian gave many classic performances including in Hekayty Ma'a El-Zaman, Moled Ya Donia, Bamba Kashar, and many others.

Death
He died on 5 June 2019 due to a stroke, at the age of 75.

References

1944 births
2019 deaths
Egyptian male stage actors
Egyptian comedians
Male comedians
20th-century Egyptian male actors
20th-century comedians
21st-century Egyptian male actors
21st-century comedians
People from Zagazig